The 1928 Furman Purple Hurricane football team represented the Furman University as a member of the Southern Intercollegiate Athletic Association (SIAA) during the 1928 college football season. Led by first year head coach T. B. Amis, the Purple Hurricane compiled an overall record of 5–4, with a mark of 3–1 in conference play, and finished tied for sixth in the SIAA.

Schedule

References

Furman
Furman Paladins football seasons
Furman Purple Hurricane football